Denis Maksimovich Mashkin (born 16 July 1996) is a former Russian football player.

Club career
He played his first game for the main squad of FC Rostov on 24 September 2015 in a Russian Cup game against FC Tosno.

References

External links
 
 
 

1996 births
Living people
Russian footballers
FC Rostov players
Association football midfielders